The Valentine House in Macon, Georgia was a historic building that was listed on the National Register of Historic Places in 1969.  It was ordered demolished later.

References

Houses on the National Register of Historic Places in Georgia (U.S. state)
Houses in Macon, Georgia
National Register of Historic Places in Bibb County, Georgia